Edith Mary Wardlaw Burnet Hughes HonFRIAS (7 July 1888 – 28 August 1971) was a Scottish architect, and is considered Britain's first practising female architect, having established her own architecture firm in 1920.

Early life
Edith Mary Burnet was born in Edinburgh, the daughter of May Crudelius and George Wardlaw Burnet, an advocate. The family lived at 6 West Circus Place in the Stockbridge district. The family moved to 59 Queens Road in Aberdeen when her father was created Sheriff Substitute for Aberdeenshire around 1890.

Her grandmother Mary Crudelius campaigned for women's education. Following her father's death in 1901 she was raised by her uncle, John James Burnet, a prominent architect. They lived at 18 University Gardens in Glasgow.

She travelled in Europe, studying art and architecture, and attending lectures at the Sorbonne, until around 1911, when she joined Gray's School of Art, Aberdeen. Initially studying garden design, she switched to architecture, and was awarded a diploma in 1914. The following year she was appointed a lecturer at the School. She briefly worked in the office of Jenkins and Marr, before marrying her former tutor, architect Thomas Harold Hughes (1887–1949), in 1918.

Career

Hughes and her husband were refused a place in Burnet's London office, partly because there was no female lavatory. However, her husband joined Burnet's Glasgow office as a partner in 1919. Disagreement with another partner led to his departing the following year, to take up teaching at the Glasgow School of Art, where he later became head of architecture. She set up her own practice in Glasgow in 1920. In 1927, she became the first woman nominated for membership of the Royal Institute of British Architects (RIBA), the nominators including John Begg and her uncle, John Burnet. However, RIBA's legal advisers stated that she could not be elected, and RIBA remained an all-male institution until the election of Josephine Miller in 1938. She was similarly denied access to the Royal Incorporation of Architects in Scotland (RIAS).  After the Second World War, Hughes re-established her practice in Edinburgh. She was elected an Honorary Fellow of the RIAS in 1968. She retired from practice soon after receiving her fellowship, and moved to Kippen, dying of pneumonia in Stirling in 1971.

She is buried with her parents in Warriston Cemetery in north Edinburgh. The grave lies on the main west path on its east side, where the ground level drops to the lower south section.

Family

Hughes and her husband had three daughters. She and her husband lived mostly separately after the Second World War until his death in 1949.

Works

Her first commission was for the "Rutherford Memorial" in 1916, although the location and nature of this work are unknown. In her own work, she concentrated on domestic commissions, including many residential alterations, and specialised in kitchen design. Her public works included the Coatbridge War Memorial (1924), and the Glasgow Mercat Cross (1930), a replica of a medieval mercat cross located at Glasgow Cross. She carried out alterations to the Glasgow Society of Lady Artists' building in Blythswood Square, Glasgow, and was responsible for the conversion of several Edinburgh townhouses into flats. She was engaged on works at St Mary's Episcopal Cathedral and Music School, Edinburgh, from 1956 to 1965. Her most important commissions for the Cathedral were the stone font, with its wrought iron cover, and a wrought iron screen to the Chapel of St Margaret of Scotland.

See also
Women in architecture

Notes

References

20th-century Scottish architects
Academics of Robert Gordon University
Architects from Edinburgh
Alumni of Gray's School of Art
1888 births
1971 deaths
British women architects
Academics of the Glasgow School of Art
Fellows of the Royal Incorporation of Architects in Scotland
Deaths from pneumonia in Scotland